The R1 is a line of Rodalies de Catalunya's Barcelona commuter rail service, operated by Renfe Operadora. It runs northwards from the Barcelona area to the southern limits of the province of Girona, passing through the coastal Maresme region. Since 2014, some services have been extended further north towards Portbou, near the French border. These services are designated RG1 and are considered part of the Girona commuter rail service. The line had an annual ridership of 28 million in 2016, achieving an average weekday ridership of 102,214 according to 2008 data.

R1–RG1 trains primarily run on the Barcelona–Mataró–Maçanet-Massanes railway, the first railway line in the Iberian Peninsula.

Together with lines , R3, and R4, the R1 (then simply numbered line 1) started services in 1989 as one of the first lines of the Cercanías commuter rail system for Barcelona, known as Rodalia Barcelona. Originally, R1 services had two southern termini, L'Hospitalet de Llobregat and Barcelona–El Prat Airport stations. In 2005, all trains terminating at the airport moved their southern terminus to Molins de Rei. In the long-term future, it is projected that the R1 will take over the southern section of line R2, creating a major north–south axis that will extend along the coast of the Barcelona metropolitan area.

History
Earlier, all the commuter rail services coming from Mataró used the route through Poblenou, terminating at Estació de les Rodalies, a terminus station that was located adjacent to the still existing Estació de França. All services coming from Mataró were then rerouted through the Sagrera rail complex and the Meridiana Tunnel to access Barcelona, terminating at L'Hospitalet de Llobregat or Barcelona–El Prat Airport stations, depending on the station of origin. The services coming from Mataró terminated at the airport, whilst the services coming from north of Mataró terminated at L'Hospitalet de Llobregat. Since the new through line scheme offered more stops within Barcelona and better connections with the city's metro system, the line's ridership doubled. Throughout 1989, this new line scheme was incorporated as part of line 1 of Rodalia Barcelona (predecessor of the R1), the Cercanías commuter rail system for the Barcelona area, created in the same year.

On 4 December 2005, the services between Mataró and the airport were suspended due to the construction works of the Madrid–Barcelona high-speed rail line in Barcelona's southern access, leaving the airport without any direct trains to Barcelona. These services moved their southern terminus from the airport to Molins de Rei, originating the line's current termini. The R1 also started operating as a shuttle line between the airport and El Prat de Llobregat railway station until 22 July 2006, when line  was created, providing a direct rail link between the airport and central Barcelona anew.

Infrastructure
Like the rest of Rodalies de Catalunya lines, the R1–RG1 runs on the Iberian gauge mainline railway system, which is owned by Adif, an agency of the Spanish government. All of the railway lines carrying Rodalies de Catalunya services are electrified at 3,000 volts (V) direct current (DC) using overhead lines. The trains on the line call at up to 48 stations, using the following railway lines, in order from south to north:

The entire length of the Barcelona–Mataró–Maçanet-Massanes railway is solely used by the R1–RG1, though the rest of the infrastructure it uses is shared with other services. South of L'Hospitalet de Llobregat, it shares tracks with Rodalies de Catalunya's Barcelona commuter rail service line . Between L'Hospitalet de Llobregat and Arc de Triomf stations, R1 and RG1 trains share tracks with commuter rail lines  and R4, and regional rail line , using the Meridiana Tunnel through central Barcelona. After Arc de Triomf, they branch off to El Clot-Aragó railway station, running on exclusive tracks from this point on to Maçanet-Massanes. North of Maçanet-Massanes, the R1–RG1 shares tracks with regional line  and freight services.

In May 2015, Adif announced that the R1–RG1 would be the first Rodalies de Catalunya line to feature the European Rail Traffic Management System (ERTMS) signaling and security system.

Operation

Furthermore, since 31 January 2009, there have been no limited services, so that the entirety of R1 and RG1 trains call at all stations. The first trains run about 5:00 in the morning, with the latest arriving at about 1:00 at night.

The designation of the services operating on the line depends on the route they operate. The services between Molins de Rei and Maçanet-Massanes are designated R1 in coordination with the rest of Barcelona commuter rail service lines, whilst the services between L'Hospitalet de Llobregat and other stations located further north of Maçanet-Massanes are designated RG1 (the letter 'G' stands for Girona) to indicate that they are part of the Girona commuter rail service. RG1 services began operating on  after former R1 services between L'Hospitalet de Llobregat and Maçanet-Massanes were extended northwards to Figueres. Since , some of these services have been extended further north to Portbou.

, the service routes operating on the R1–RG1 are as follows:

The line's activity gathers on the section between L'Hospitalet de Llobregat and Mataró, where a peak-time frequency of 6 minutes has been offered since 26 June 2011, that is the highest on any line of the Rodalies de Catalunya system. The service frequency reduces as the line moves away from Barcelona, especially on the section north of Maçanet-Massanes, where only RG1 services operate on weekdays, and which is already served by regional rail line . Moreover, the R1 does not operate south of L'Hospitalet de Llobregat on weekends, when this section is solely served by Barcelona commuter rail service line .

, the approximate service frequencies on the R1–RG1 are as follows:

The trains used on the R1–RG1 are Civia—specifically, the 463, 464 and 465 Series, which consist of three, four and five cars per set, respectively—and 447 Series electrical multiple units (EMU). Civia trains have been running on the line since July 2006, initially only operating services between Molins de Rei and Calella.  On average, these trains operate a total of 216 services on the line every day on weekdays, accounting for a ridership of 102,214, according to 2008 data.

Future
The 2008–2015 Rail Infrastructure Master Plan for the Barcelona Commuter Rail Service, developed by the Spanish Ministry of Public Works and Transport, plans to establish a "coast-to-coast" and "inland-to-inland" line scheme. The R1 will become the "coast-to-coast" line, creating a new major south–north axis along the coast of the Barcelona metropolitan area. R1 trains will continue to use the Meridiana Tunnel in central Barcelona with the new line scheme, which is currently not possible due to the configuration of the southern rail accesses to Barcelona Sants. A long-term project with an uncertain completion date, the new configuration would require multimillion-euro investments since it is associated with the construction of a new underground route in L'Hospitalet de Llobregat for the Rodalies de Catalunya lines running through the city as well as the new rail link for Barcelona–El Prat Airport.

As stated in the master plan, the proposed peak-time service frequencies for the future R1 would be as follows:

List of stations

The following table lists the name of each station served by line R1–RG1 in order from south to north; the station's service pattern offered by R1 and/or RG1 trains; the transfers to other Rodalies de Catalunya lines, including both commuter and regional rail services; remarkable transfers to other transport systems; the municipality in which each station is located; and the fare zone(s) each station belongs to according to the Autoritat del Transport Metropolità (ATM Àrea de Barcelona) and the Autoritat Territorial de la Mobilitat de l'Àrea de Girona (ATM Àrea de Girona) fare-integrated public transport systems, as well as Rodalies de Catalunya's own fare zone system for Barcelona commuter rail service lines.

Notes

References

Bibliography

External links
 Rodalies de Catalunya official website
 Schedules for the R1–RG1 (PDF format): Molins de Rei–Figueres section Mataró–Portbou section (limited version for the Girona commuter rail service)
 Official Twitter accounts by Rodalies de Catalunya for lines R1 and RG1 with service status updates (tweets usually published only in Catalan)
 
 R1 (rodalia 1) on Twitter. Unofficial Twitter account by Rodalia.info monitoring real-time information about the R1 provided by its users.
 Information about lines R1 and RG1 at trenscat.cat 

1
Railway services introduced in 1989